Mouanko is a town and commune in the Littoral Region of Cameroon, lying on the north bank of the Sanaga River.
It is the main town of the Douala Edéa Wildlife Reserve.

See also
Communes of Cameroon

References

External links
 Site de la primature – Élections municipales 2002 
 Contrôle de gestion et performance des services publics communaux des villes camerounaises  – Thèse de Donation Avele, Université Montesquieu Bordeaux IV 
 Charles Nanga, La réforme de l’administration territoriale au Cameroun à la lumière de la loi constitutionnelle n° 96/06 du 18 janvier 1996, Mémoire ENA. 

Populated places in Littoral Region (Cameroon)
Communes of Cameroon